The Gold Bullion Coin Act of 1985, Pub. Produced from gold mined in the United States, American Eagles are imprinted with their gold content and legal tender face value.

The act was passed by United States Congress pursuant to its exclusive power to coin money and set its value, set forth in Article I, Section 8, Clause 5 of the United States Constitution. It was signed by Ronald Reagan on December 17, 1985. One requirement is that all gold used in minting the coins would be from "newly mined domestic sources".

Gold coins as legal tender

The case of Ling Su Fan v. United States, establishes the legal distinction of a coin bearing the "impress" of the sovereign:

The case of Thompson v. Butler, establishes that the law makes no legal distinction between the values of coin and paper money used as legal tender:

References

External links
Complete Act

99th United States Congress
United States federal currency legislation
Gold legislation